Mount Loweth is a snow-topped mountain,  high, located  east-northeast of Anderson Dome in the eastern end of the Jones Mountains, Antarctica. The mountain was first mapped and named by the University of Minnesota-Jones Mountains Party, 1960–61, who also named some of its notable features. The peak itself was named by the Advisory Committee on Antarctic Names for Hugh F. Loweth of the Executive Offices of the President, who was instrumental in the development of American programs for Antarctica.

Rockfall Cliff is a conspicuous rock cliff which marks the mountain's northwest face, named because the continual falling of rocks made examination of the area hazardous. Pond Ridge is a flattish rock ridge which extends north from Mount Loweth, named because a small pond was discovered on the ridge.

See also
 Mountains in Antarctica

References

Mountains of Ellsworth Land